Sredne-Voskresenskoye is a rural locality (a selo) in Krinichenskoye Rural Settlement, Ostrogozhsky District, Voronezh Oblast, Russia. The population was 72 as of 2010. There are 8 streets.

Geography 
Sredne-Voskresenskoye is located 18 km northeast of Ostrogozhsk (the district's administrative centre) by road. Rybnoye is the nearest rural locality.

References 

Rural localities in Ostrogozhsky District